Charles Swini (born 28 February 1985 in Blantyre) is a Malawian footballer, who currently plays for Civo United.

On 23 January 2015, Swini signed for UD Songo on a season loan.

In March 2020, signed for Civo United.

International career
Swini is a current member of the Malawi national football team and played for his country at the 2010 African Cup of Nations in Angola.

References

1985 births
Living people
People from Blantyre
Malawian footballers
Silver Strikers FC players
Malawi international footballers
2010 Africa Cup of Nations players
Malawian expatriate footballers
UD Songo players
Malawian expatriate sportspeople in Mozambique
Association football goalkeepers